Thuravoor is a Gram Panchayat in Aluva Taluk of Ernakulam District in the South Indian state of Kerala. Thuravoor Grama Panchayath is nearly 5 km from Angamaly Town. The Panchayat covers 12.13 km2 in area. The borders of this panchayat are Mookkannoor and Manjapra Panchayat in the north, Manjapra, Malayattoor-Neeleeswaram Panchayat in the East. Kalady panchayat and Angamaly Municipality in the south, and Karukutty and Mookkannoor Panchayat on the west.

The first President of Thuravoor Panchayat was P.O. Jose. Nearest Railway station is Angamaly. Cochin International Airport is situated 8 km from Thuravoor. Angamaly-Manjapra Road and Kalady-Mookkannoor Road are the major roads passing through the panchayat.

Thuravoor has a Panchayat office, primary health center, Krishi Bahavan and electricity office.

History 
The name Thuravoor is derived from "the oor of thuras", meaning "the land of small lakes". In ancient times people abandoned the area due to contagious diseases or natural disasters. The place remained as a forest for a long time. In 1930, people found large stone steps at Cheenam Chira along with large mud jars from various parts of Thuravoor to support this historical fact. The main temple of Thuravoor, Kuamarakulam temple, is nearly 1000 years old. St Augustine's UP School was opened in 1921. Mar Augustine High School was established in 1982. The first bus service through Thuravoor panchayat was started in 1953. The areas under Thuravoor Grama Panchayat include Udhupin Kavala, Thalakotaparambu, Vathakad, Kidangoor and areas of Yoodhapuram.

Agriculture 
Major agricultural products include rice, rubber, coconut, banana and nutmeg.

Banks 
Catholic Syrian Bank thuravoor
Thuravoor Service Co operative Bank, Thuravoor

Educational institutions

Primary schools 
 Sree Bhadra LP School Kidangoor
 St Mary's LP School Thuravoor
 Little Flowe LPS Vathakkad
 Infant Jesus LPS Kidangoor
 Fathimamatha LPS anappara

UP schools
 St Augustin's UPS Thuravoor
 Sree Bhadra LP School North Kidangoor

High schools
 Mar Augustine's HS Thuravoor
 St Joseph HSS Kidangoor

Temples 
 Sree Thalakkottuparambilamma Temple
 Sree Komaran Temple
 Kumarakulam Sree Subramanyan Temple
 Kulappurakavu Bhagavathi Temple
 Kavalakattu Siva Temple
 Sree Maha Vishnu Temple Kidangoor
 Sree Kovattu Bhagavathy Temple, Kidangoor
 Vilangappurath Sree Badrakali Temple, Kidangoor
 Sree Subhramanya Swami Temple, Kidangoor
 Sree Puthukulangara Bhagavathi Temple

Churches 
 St. Augustine's Church Thuravoor
 St. Sebastine's Church Kidangoor
 Infant Jusus Church, Kidangoor
 Fathima Matha Church, Anappara
 St.john's Baptist church, Yordhanapuram
 Bhatharani church Vathakkad
 St. Sebastine's Church Devagiri
 St:Jude's Roman Catholic Church Yoodhapuram

Notable people 
 VT Bhattathirippad - an Indian social critic, well-known dramatist and a prominent freedom fighter
 A P Kurian, Former Speaker-  6th Kerala Legislative Assembly from 15-02-1980 to 01-02-1982

Transportation 
 Nearest railway station - Angamaly is 4 km from Thuravoor and major railway station Aluva Railway Station is 19 km away
 Airport - Cochin International Airport at Nedumbassery is 8 km from Thuravoor

Major Roads 
Angamaly-Manjapra Road
Kalady-Mookkannoor Road

Politics 
Currently Thuravoor Panchayath is ruled by the United Democratic Front or (UDF) Led by Indian National Congress (INC) party.(2020 election)

External links 

Kerala LSG Department

References

Villages in Ernakulam district